Kamlesh Shukla is an Indian politician and a member of 17th Legislative Assembly of Uttar Pradesh of India. He represents the Rampur Karkhana Assembly constituency in Deoria district of Uttar Pradesh and is a member of the Bhartiya Janata Party.

Early life and education
Shukla was born 8 October 1952 in Deoria, Uttar Pradesh to his father Ramnaresh Shukla. He married Tara Devi, they have three sons and one daughter. He belongs to Brahman family. He had 8th Passed from Aditya Nath Jha Inter College, Rudrapur.

Political career
Shukla has been MLA for one term. Since 2017, he represents Rampur Karkhana constituency as a member of Bhartiya Janata Party. He defeated Samajwadi Party candidate Fasiha Manzer Ghazala Lari by a margin of 9,987 votes.

Posts held

References

Bharatiya Janata Party politicians from Uttar Pradesh
People from Deoria district
Living people
Uttar Pradesh MLAs 2017–2022
1952 births